Chancery Lane, Barbados is a town located in the province of Christ Church, Barbados. It is located in the south coast of Barbados. Chancery Lane is known for its pottery. The towns pottery dates back to the Saladoid period.

References 

Populated places in Barbados